The Bandidos Motorcycle Club, like other prominent outlaw motorcycle clubs, utilizes smaller motorcycle clubs – known as support clubs, "puppet clubs" or "satellite clubs" – as auxiliary units. These support clubs, mostly regional, are subservient to the will of the Bandidios and, in general, are typically used for protection, promotion or financing, but can also be used to facilitate criminal activities such as drug trafficking, extortion, assault and murder.

The coalition of Bandidos support clubs are often referred to as the "Red and Gold Family" as well as the "Red and Gold Nation". It is common for the logos and insignia of these groups to bear the Bandidos colors in reverse, which can be seen on their patches and merchandise.

International
 Caballeros MC – Active in the United Kingdom and Germany.
 Cazador MC – Active in the United States and Indonesia.
 Chicanos MC – Active in Germany, the Netherlands, Norway, Russia, Serbia, Sweden, Ukraine, and the United Arab Emirates.
 Diablos MC – Active in Australia, Belgium, Finland, Germany, Indonesia, Kazakhstan, Laos, Singapore, Sweden, Thailand, Ukraine and the United Arab Emirates.
 Harami (Haramy) MC – Active in Germany and Turkey.
 Hermanos MC – Active in Germany and the United States.
 Imperator MC – Active in the United States and Norway.
 Leones MC – Active in Finland and Thailand.
 Pistoleros MC – Active in the United States and England.
 Predadores MC – Active in Thailand and Belgium.
 X-Team – Active in Denmark, Finland, Germany, Norway, Sweden and Brunei.
 Zapata MC – Active in Brazil and Germany.
 Los Moros - Active in Morocco.

Australia
 Fat Mexican Support Club

Belgium
 Dragon of the Road

Brunei
 El Muerte MC

Canada
 Los Montoneros MC

Denmark
 East Coast Soldiers
 Evil Loyalty
 Mexican Teamwork

Ecuador
 Pitbulls MC

Finland
 Bad Attitude Crew
 Black Rhinos MC

France
 Bomber-Raiders
Official Mercenary Motorcycle Club

Germany
 Bulldogs MC
 Burnout Company MC
 Calavera MC
 Crew 45
 Cuadrilla MC
 Darkrage MC
 El Militante
 Escuderos MC
 Gringos MC
 Guerrilleros MC
 Harley Crew MC
 Iron Bloods 58
 Iron Dragons MC
 La Honra MC
 Libertad Vagueros MC
 Lones MC
 Los Aliados MC
 Los Pacos
 Malditos MC
 Malos Hombres MC
 Mexican Syndicate
 Minotaurus MC
 Picaros MC
 Rapidos MC
 Rotstein Adler MC
 Team Scorpion
 Vengator MC

Indonesia
 Jokers 888 MC

Italy
 Ronins MC
 RipperS MC Italy

Norway
 Samurai MC

Portugal
 Red & Gold

Russia
 Steel Crew MC
 Tunderstruck MC
 Girls Gang MFC

Singapore
 Ghostriders MC
 Iron Chariots MC

Spain
 Acciriders MC

Sweden
 Aggressive MC
 Aphuset MC
 Area 42 MC
 Bad Breed MC
 Bear Jaw MC
 Bulldogs MC
 Cobra MC
 Kvillebäcken MC
 Ladrones MC
 Loyalty BFL
 Southern Bikers MC

Thailand
Cyclops MC

United States
 Aces and Eights MC
 Alabama Riders
 Amigos MC
 Arawyns MC
 Asgard MC
 Bandoleros MC
 Black Berets MC
 Brass Knuckles MC
 Canyon Riders MC
 Cuchillos MC
 Desperados MC
 Desgarciados MC
 Destralos MC
 Guardian MC
 Gurio MC
 Gray Ghosts MC
 Hombres MC
 Intrepido MC
 Junkyard Dawgs MC
 LA Riders MC
 Latin Steel MC
 Los Homeboys MC
 Los Vagabundos MC 
 Martyrs MC
 Mississippi Riders
 OK Riders MC
 Organized Chaos MC
 Ozark Riders MC
 Pacoteros MC
 Peligrosos MC
 Phantoms MC
 Savages MC
 Serpents of Medusa WMC
 Tejanos MC
 Thunder-Heads MC

See also 
 List of Hells Angels support clubs

References 

Support clubs